John Rosemond (born November 25, 1947) is an American columnist, public speaker, and author on parenting, with 15 books on the subject. His ideas revolve around authority for parents and discipline for children.

Personal life and education 
Rosemond grew up in South Carolina until age 7 when he moved with his family to Chicago. He earned his master's degree in psychology at Western Illinois University.

At age 20, he married Willie Herman. They had two children.

Criticism 
Rosemond has received criticism for his recommendations on toilet training and spanking because they contradict other parenting experts' recommendations.

In 1992, Rosemond wrote a column in which he stated that an 18-month-old girl who had been sexually abused on one occasion by a non-family member (babysitter) was unlikely to ever remember the event; therefore, therapy was not called for. Rosemond's advice was in line with research into human memory which finds that regardless of the nature of an event, permanent memory does not form until around age 36 months, on average. However, it directly contradicts years of research indicating that preverbal trauma has lifelong psychological and neurodevelopmental effects, especially if untreated.

In 2013, the Kentucky Psychology Board initiated a letter to Rosemond from the Attorney General of Kentucky, charging Rosemond with practicing psychology in Kentucky without a license issued by them. The charge was based solely on the fact that Rosemond's syndicated column appears in five Kentucky newspapers. Rosemond sued the Kentucky Psychology Board and Attorney General in federal court, charging them with attempting to suppress his First Amendment rights. He subsequently released the Attorney General from the suit. The Psychology Board refused to back down and the case went to court. Rosemond won in October 2015.

Books 
Rosemond has authored or co-authored fifteen books, including:

Books as sole author:

 
 
 
 
 
 
 
 
 
 
 
 
 
 

Books with others:

References

External links
website

Living people
American family and parenting writers
1947 births
Writers from Charleston, South Carolina
Writers from Chicago
Western Illinois University alumni
People from Gastonia, North Carolina